The Vancouver Film Critics Circle Award for Best Director is an annual award given by the Vancouver Film Critics Circle.

Winners

2000s

2010s

2020s

References

Vancouver Film Critics Circle Awards
Awards for best director